The Nashville Symphony is an American symphony orchestra, based in Nashville, Tennessee.  The orchestra is resident at the Schermerhorn Symphony Center.

History
In 1920, prior to the 1946 founding of the Nashville Symphony, a group of amateur and professional musicians established an orchestral ensemble in Nashville, electing Nashville Banner music critic and Vanderbilt University professor George Pullen Jackson to serve as their president and manager.  Despite steady growth over the next decade, that organization fell victim to The Depression. In 1945, World War II veteran and Nashville native Walter Sharp returned home from the war intent on establishing a new symphony for Middle Tennessee.  With the assistance of a small number of fellow music lovers, he convinced community leaders of this need and the Nashville Symphony was founded.

Sharp retained William Strickland, a young conductor from New York, to serve as its first music director and conductor.  The orchestra performed its first concert in the fall of 1946 at War Memorial Auditorium in downtown Nashville. Over the ensuing five seasons, Strickland was responsible for setting the high performance standards that the orchestra and its conductors have maintained to this day.  Guy Taylor (1951–1959), Willis Page (1959–1967), Thor Johnson (1967–1975) and Michael Charry (1976–1982) were successive music directors.  During Charry's tenure, the symphony moved its subscription series from War Memorial Auditorium to Jackson Hall in the Tennessee Performing Arts Center.

Beginning in 1983, Music Director and Principal Conductor Kenneth Schermerhorn led the Nashville Symphony for 22 years, until his death in April 2005.  The orchestra's profile increased during his tenure through recordings, television broadcasts and an East Coast tour, which culminated in a performance at Carnegie Hall on September 25, 2000.  Following Schermerhorn's death, in April 2006, Leonard Slatkin was named the orchestra's artistic advisor, for a contract of three years, through 2009.

In September 2006, the Symphony opened Schermerhorn Symphony Center, a $123.5 million project, which includes Laura Turner Concert Hall.  Slatkin conducted the orchestra's first concert in the new hall on September 9, 2006, which included works by Shostakovich, Barber and Mahler, and a world premiere Triple Concerto by Bela Fleck, Zakir Hussain and Edgar Meyer.

In September 2007, the orchestra announced the appointment of Costa Rican conductor Giancarlo Guerrero as the seventh music director of the Nashville Symphony, effective with the 2009–2010 season, with an initial contract is for 5 years.  Under his direction, the orchestra has received a number of awards, including the 2011 ASCAP award for Programming of Contemporary Music, the 2013 ASCAP award for Programming of Contemporary Music  and National Endowment for the Arts grants supporting its commitment to American music. The orchestra's recordings have also earned a number of Grammy Awards and nominations (see Recordings below).

In March 2019, the orchestra announced the appointment of Enrico Lopez-Yañez as Principal Pops Conductor of the Nashville Symphony
after serving as the assistant conductor since 2017.

In June 2020, in the wake of the COVID-19 pandemic, the orchestra announced the suspension of its concert activities through July 31, 2021, and the furlough of 79 musicians, 49 staff members, and Guerrero on July 1, 2020.

Music directors
 William Strickland (1946–1951)
 Guy Taylor (1951–1959)
 Willis Page (1959–1967)
 Thor Johnson (1967–1975)
 Michael Charry (1976–1982)
 Kenneth Schermerhorn (1983–2005)
 Leonard Slatkin (Artistic Advisor, 2006–2009)
 Giancarlo Guerrero (2009–present)

Recordings
For the Naxos label, the orchestra has made more than 30 recordings since the year 2000. Several of these CDs have garnered a total of 24 GRAMMY® Award nominations and 13 Grammy Awards. In 2008, the orchestra's CD of the music of Joan Tower, Made in America, won 3 GRAMMY® Awards, including Best Orchestral Performance and Best Classical Album. In 2011, the orchestra's CD of music by Michael Daugherty, "Deus Ex Machina," won 3 Grammy Awards, and the following year its recording of music by Christopher Rouse, "Concerto for Percussion and Orchestra," earned one GRAMMY® Award. Most recently, the orchestra's 2016 recording of works by Jennifer Higdon earned two GRAMMY® Awards. 

 Abraham Lincoln Portraits, featuring works by Charles Ives, Aaron Copland, Roy Harris and others (2009)
 Beach: "Gaelic" Symphony; Piano Concerto (2003)
 Beethoven: Missa Solemnis, Op. 123 (2004)
 Beethoven: Symphony No. 7 (1996)
 Bernstein: Dybbuk / Fancy Free (complete ballets) (2006)
 Bernstein: West Side Story: The Original Score (2002)
 Carter: Symphony No. 1; Piano Concerto (2004)
 Chadwick: Orchestral Works Thalia / Melpomene / Euterpe (2002)
 Corigliano: A Dylan Thomas Trilogy (2008)
 Daugherty: Metropolis Symphony; Deus ex Machina (2009)
 "Danielpour: Darkness in the Ancient Valley" (2013)
 "Fleck: The Impostor" (2013)
 Gershwin: Porgy and Bess (Original 1935 Production Version) (2006)
 Gould: Fall River Legend; Jekyll and Hyde Variations (2005)
 Hanson: Orchestral Works, Vol. 1 (2000)
 Ives: Symphony No. 2; Robert Browning Overture (2000)
 Menotti: Amahl and the Night Visitors (2008)
 Mussorgsky: Pictures at an Exhibition (Compiled by Leonard Slatkin) (2008)
 "Paulus: Three Places of Enlightenment" (2014)
 "Piazzolla: Sinfonía Buenos Aires" (2010)
 Ravel: L'Enfant et les sortilèges; Shéhérazade (2009)
 "Schwantner: Chasing Light..." (2011)
 "Sierra: Sinfonía No. 4" (2013)
 So There with Ben Folds (2015)
 Tower: Made in America / Tambor / Concerto for Orchestra (2007)
 Riders in the Sky: Lassoed Live at the Schermerhorn (2009)
 Villa-Lobos: Bachianas Brasileiras (Complete) (2005)

Education and community engagement
Music education has been an integral part of the Nashville Symphony's mission for much of its existence. Early in the orchestra's history, ensembles of musicians visited local schools. The orchestra has also offered free concerts for Nashville-area students since at least the 1970s. Most recently, the orchestra launched the Accelerando program, which is designed to create opportunities for young musicians from ethnic communities underrepresented in American orchestras. The program has received funding from the Andrew W. Mellon Foundation.

References

External links
 Official website of the Nashville Symphony
 Naxos Records page on Nashville Symphony discography and profile page
 Giving Matters Nashville Symphony nonprofit profile

American orchestras
Symphony orchestras
Musical groups established in 1946
Culture of Nashville, Tennessee
Tourist attractions in Nashville, Tennessee
Performing arts in Tennessee
Musical groups from Tennessee
1946 establishments in Tennessee